Drive Like Jehu is the debut album by the American post-hardcore band Drive Like Jehu, released in 1991 by Cargo Music and Headhunter Records.

Though not as highly regarded as their second and final album Yank Crime, the album did gain the notice of the emerging noise rock and math rock movements, which would later lead many fans to regard Drive Like Jehu as a link between these genres. The album also helped to attract the attention of major record labels, leading both Drive Like Jehu and guitarist John Reis' other band Rocket From the Crypt to sign a lucrative deal with Interscope Records.

Reception
Ned Raggett of Allmusic gave Drive Like Jehu 4½ stars out of 5, remarking that "The Rick Froberg/John Reis guitar team sound like they've been dipped in battery acid, wired to a power station, and let absolutely loose, screaming, nervous riffs piled on top of each other and taking off for Mars. Froberg's own wild scream singing suits it perfectly, sounding like something's about to give and leave nothing in its wake ... Everything is done in the service of intensity and emotion, winding everything up to explode and then explode again".

Track listing
All tracks by Drive Like Jehu

"Caress" – 3:55
"Spikes to You" – 2:18
"Step on Chameleon" – 5:12
"O Pencil Sharp" – 9:42
"Atom Jack" – 2:23
"If it Kills You" – 7:12
"Good Luck in Jail" – 4:05
"Turn it Off" – 6:12
"Future Home of Stucco Monstrosity" – 3:58

Personnel
Rick Froberg – lead vocals, rhythm guitar, album art
John Reis – lead guitar, backing vocals, lead vocals on "Step on Chameleon"
Mike Kennedy – bass
Mark Trombino – drums

Album information
Record label: Cargo Music, Headhunter Records
Recorded 1991 at Westbeach Recorders by Donnell Cameron and Joe Peccerillo
All songs published by Drive Like Jehu
Produced by Drive Like Jehu and Donnell Cameron
Mastered at K Disc by John Golden
Cover artwork by Rick Froberg

References 

Drive Like Jehu albums
1991 debut albums